The China Report is a refereed academic journal that provides platform for free expression and discussion of different ideas, approaches and viewpoints which assist a better understanding of China and its East Asian neighbours. Launched in 1964, China Report has, over the years, widened its interests and aims and transformed itself into a scholarly journal that seeks a better understanding of China and its East Asian neighbours - particularly their cultures, their development and their relations with China. The journal is published by SAGE Publications, India four times a year in association with the Institute of Chinese Studies.

The journal is a member of the Committee on Publication Ethics (COPE).

Abstracting and indexing 
China Report is abstracted and indexed in:

 ProQuest: International Bibliography of the Social Sciences (IBSS)
 Scopus
 DeepDyve
 Portico
 Dutch-KB
 Pro-Quest-RSP
 EBSCO
 OCLC
 Ohio
 ICI
 ProQuest-Illustrata
 J-Gate

References

External links 
 
 Homepage

SAGE Publishing academic journals
Publications established in 1986
Chinese studies journals
Area studies
Ethnic studies journals